This is a list of high schools in the state of South Dakota.

Current schools

Closed schools
This is an incomplete list of former schools, nicknames, years closed, and additional info.

 Agar High School "Hi-Pointers" (pre-1984)/"Chargers" (1993-20??), Agar (Closed 1984, reopened 1993, closed 20??, now part of Sully Buttes High School)
 Akaska High School "Raiders"
 Alpena High School "Wildcats", Alpena 
 Amherst High School "Wildcats"
 Andover High School "Gorillas"
 Ardmore High School "Rattlers"
 Argonne High School "Arrows"
 Artesian-Letcher High School "Rams", Artesian (Closed, now part of Sanborn Central High School)
 Ashton High School "Cardinals"
 Astoria High School "Comets"
 Athol High School "Arrows"
 Augustana Academy "Knights", Canton
 Bancroft Eagles
 Barnard Bears
 Bath Warriors
 Belvidere Comets
 Big Stone City Lions
 Blunt Monarchs
 Bonesteel Tigers
 Bonilla Eagles
 Bradley Bombers
 Brandt Bulldogs
 Brentford Braves
 Bridgewater Wildcats
 Bristol High School "Pirates", Bristol (Closed in 2004)
 Bruce Bees
 Bryant Scotties
 Buffalo Gap Buffaloes
 Burbank Owls
 Burke Bulldogs
 Canning Coyotes
 Canova Eagles
 Carthage Eagles
 Cathedral High School "Gaels", Rapid City
 Cathedral High School "Irish", Sioux Falls
 Cavour Cougars
 Chancellor Wildcats
 Claire City Comets
 Claremont Honkers
 Clark Comets
 Colman Wildcats
 Colton Panthers
 Conde High School "Spartans", Conde (closed, now part of Doland High, Groton High, Northwestern High)
 Corona Midgets
 Corsica Comets
 Cottonwood Coyotes
 Columbia Comets
 Cresbard High School "Comets", Cresbard (Closed, now part of Faulkton Area School)
 Dallas Coyotes
 Dante Gophers
 Davis Bulldogs
 Deadwood Bears
 Delmont Wildcats
 Draper Bulldogs
 Eagle Butte Warriors
 Eastern High School "Yellowjackets", Madison
 Egan Bluejays
 Elk Point Pointers
 Emery High School "Eagles", Emery (Consolidated with Bridgewater in 2011, now called Bridgewater-Emery High School)
 Erwin Arrows
 Fairfax Broncos
 Farmer Orioles
 Fedora Tigers
 Florence Flyers
 Forestburg Buccaneers
 Frankfort Falcons
 Franklin Flyers
 Fort Pierre Buffaloes
 Fort Thompson Buffaloes
 Fulton Pirates
 Gann Valley Buffaloes
 Garden City Dragons
 Gary Tigers
 Gayville Orioles
 Geddes Rams
 General Beadle High School "Bluejays", Madison
 Glenham High School "Eagles", Glenham, South Dakota (closed in 1984, now part of Selby Area Schools)
 Goodwin Eagles
 Harrold High School, Harrold (Closed, now part of Highmore-Harrold Schools)
 Hartford Pirates
 Hayti Redbirds
 Hazel Mustangs
 Hecla Rockets
 Henry Owls
 Hetland Broncos
 Hitchcock Bluejays
 Holabird Cardinals
 Hosmer Tigers (Closed, now part of Edmunds-Central Schools)
 Hudson Trojans
 Humboldt Eagles
 Hurley High School "Bulldogs", Hurley, (Closed, now part of Viborg-Hurley High School)
 Interior Cubs
 Irene High School "Cardinals", Irene (Closed, now part of Irene-Wakonda)
 Isabel High School "Wildcats", Isabel (Closed, now Part of Timber Lake High, Mclntosh High)
 Java Panthers (Closed, now part of Selby Area Schools)
 Jefferson Blackhawks
 Kennebec Canaries
 Kidder Tigers
 Lake City Golden Eagles
 Lake Norden Bluejays
 Lane Trojans
 Lebanon Bulldogs
 Letcher Tigers
 Lily Wildcats
 Logan Arrows
 Loyalton Lions
 Lyons Lions
 Midland High School, Midland (Closed, now part of Kadoka Area High School)
 Martin Warriors
 Meckling Panthers
 Melette Terriers
 Monroe "Wooden Shoed Canaries"
 New Effington Tigers
 Nisland Mustangs
 Northville Panthers
 Northwestern Lutheran Academy Wildcats
 Notre Dame High School "Comets", Mitchell
 Oldham Dragons
 Olivet Eagles
 Onaka Pirates
 Onida Warriors
 Orient Hawks
 Orland Eagles
 Peever Panthers
 Pickstown Engineers
 Piedmont Hawks
 Pierpont Panthers
 Plano Panthers
 Pollock High School "Bulldogs", Pollock (Closed, now part of Mobridge-Pollock High School)
 Polo Bears
 Presho Wolves
 Provo Rattlers
 Pukwana Wildcats
 Quinn Quintuplets
 Ramona Rockets
 Ravinia Bears
 Raymond Redwings
 Ree Heights Warriors
 Reliance Longhorns
 Rockham Trojans
 Roscoe Hornets
 Roslyn High School "Vikings", Roslyn
 St. Agatha High School "Agates", Howard
 St. Lawrence Wolves
 St. Martens High School "Ravens", Rapid City
 St. Thomas Shamrocks
 Salem Cubs
 Seneca Bluejays
 Sherman Tigers
 Sinai Rebels
 Spencer Cardinals
 South Dakota School for the Deaf Pheasants
 South Shore Comets
 Springfield Trojans
 Stickney High School "Raiders", Stickney (Closed, now part of Corsica-Stickney High School)
 Strandburg Tigers
 Stratford Vikings
 Tabor Cardinals
 Thomas Tigers
 Thompson Buffaloes
 Thorpe Wolves
 Trent Warriors
 Toronto Vikings
 Tripp Wildcats
 Tulare Chieftains
 Turton Frogs
 Tyndall Panthers
 Vale Beetdiggers
 Valley Springs Wolverines
 Veblen High School "Cardinals", Veblen (Closed, now part of Sisseton High School)
 Vienna Panthers
 Virgil Pirates
 Vivian Bearcats
 Volin Bluejays
 Wakonda High School "Warriors", Wakonda (Closed, now part of Irene-Wakonda)
 Wallace Bulldogs
 Wasta Flyers
 Waverly Woodchucks
 Wentworth Warriors
 Wessington Warriors
 Wessington Springs Academy "Hornets", Wessington Springs
 West Lyman Raiders
 White Wildcats
 White Lake Wolverines
 Winfred Warriors
 Willow Lake Pirates
 Witten Wildcats
 Wolsey Cardinals
 Wood Bulldogs
 Worthing Eagles
 Yale Trojans

See also
 List of school districts in South Dakota
 List of colleges and universities in South Dakota

Notes
A Sunshine Bible Academy is located 13 miles south of Miller.

Sources

Links to school web-sites.
South Dakota High School Activities Association

South Dakota
High schools